The House of the Army of the Republic of North Macedonia, before known as the House of the Yugoslav People's Army is an elite object in the city of Strumica, North Macedonia used for various events, some of them being cultural manifestations, ceremonies and sessions of the municipality. It is located in the Central Park, on Blagoj Jankov Mučeto street. After the independence of Macedonia in 1991 it was in ownership of ARM, but after the closing of the military barracks in 2005 it was given to the local municipality.

Buildings and structures in Strumica